Rogers Peet was a men's clothing company founded on November 6, 1874. Rogers Peet introduced several innovations into the men's wear business: they attached tags to garments giving fabric composition, they marked garments with price tags (the established practice was to haggle), they offered customers their money back if not satisfied, and they used illustrations of specific merchandise in their advertising. By 1877, it was headed by William R. H. Martin.

The company's reputation was strong enough that they were referenced in popular songs. In 1919, Cole Porter wrote about them in the song "I Introduced" from Hitchy-Koo of 1919, from the point of view of a man who claims to have "presented Mister Peet to Mister Rogers," having also introduced several other famous partnerships such as Morgan/Hajes, Lord & Taylor and Moet & Chandon. The song "Marry the Man Today" from the 1950 musical Guys and Dolls mentioned Rogers Peet as one of the finer things in life, alongside Reader's Digest, the actor Guy Lombardo, and Ovaltine.

The last Rogers Peet store closed in the mid-1980s.  One of their green delivery vehicles can be seen in a street scene in the 1961 film Breakfast at Tiffany's.

References

External links
Rogers Peet History
New York Songlines

Clothing companies of the United States
Companies established in 1874
Companies based in Manhattan
1874 establishments in New York (state)